Laith Al-Deen, born 20 February 1972 in Karlsruhe, West Germany, is an Iraqi German language pop musician.

Biography and Career
Born of an Iraqi father and German mother, Laith grew up in the United States and Mannheim, West Germany. He achieved first fame with his debut album, Ich will nur wissen (English: I Only Want to Know), from which came his first two singles, Bilder von Dir (English: Pictures of you, German version of the 1995 hit Everlasting Pictures of B-Zet with Darlesia) and Kleine Helden (English: Little Heroes). His second album, Melomanie, released in 2002, resulted in the singles Dein Lied (English: Your Song) and Jetzt, Hier, Immer (English: Now, Here, Always), and was just as successful as his debut album. Laith was also nominated for the Comet, a music award given by the German broadcaster VIVA in the category of Hip hop/R&B, which he declined, saying that he would only seek recognition for German-language music rather than an international award

At the beginning of 2004, Laith released the album Für Alle (English: For Everyone), which was seen a continuation of his previous musical style. The album reached the top spot on the German album charts and was Laith's greatest commercial success. The single taken from Für Alle, Alles an dir (English: Everything About You), reached #21 on the German charts, the highest position for one of Laith's singles up to that point. The second single taken from the album, Höher (English: Higher) was one of the finalists for Germany in the Eurovision Song Contest 2004. In the fall of 2004, Laith produced a live album, which performed well on the German charts for several weeks. In September 2005 a DualDisc of this live album was released, with the entire album rerecorded in 5.1 surround sound. In June 2007 a new album, Die Liebe zum Detail (English: The Love For Detail) and a new single, Keine wie du (English: No One Like You), were released. The album reached #3 on the German charts, and Keine wie du reached sixteenth position on the German singles charts.

Discography

Albums 
 2000: Ich will nur wissen ...
 2001: Ich will nur wissen ... (New-Edition)
 2002: Melomanie
 2004: Für Alle
 2004: Live
 2005: Die Frage wie
 2007: Die Liebe zum Detail
 2009: Session
 2011: Der letzte deiner Art
 2014: Was wenn alles gut geht
 2016: Bleib unterwegs

Singles 
 2000: The Invitation (Ich will nur wissen)
 2000: Bilder von dir
 2000: Kleine Helden
 2001: Noch lange nicht genug
 2002: Dein Lied
 2002: Jetzt, hier, immer
 2003: Traurig
 2003: Alles an dir
 2004: Höher
 2004: Meilenweit (featuring Zoe)
 2005: Leb den Tag
 2005: Warten und Schweigen (Download-Single)
 2007: Keine wie du
 2007: Es wird nicht leicht sein
 2008: Du
 2008: Wie soll das gehen?
 2009: Evelin
 2009: Lay Your Love on Me
 2009: If I Ever Lose My Faith
 2011: Sicher sein
 2011: Wieder tun
 2014: Was wenn alles gut geht
 2014: Steine
 2015: Nur wenn sie daenzt
 2016: Geheimnis
 2016: Bleib unterwegs
 2017: Alles dreht sich

References

External links

 Official Website
 Official Fan Club
 Laith at Musicbrainz.org

1972 births
German male musicians
German people of Iraqi descent
Musicians from Karlsruhe
Living people
Participants in the Bundesvision Song Contest
Musicians from Mannheim